The Criminal Law Amendment Act, 1968–69 was an omnibus bill that introduced major changes to the Canadian Criminal Code. An earlier version was first introduced as Bill C-195 by then-Minister of Justice Pierre Trudeau in the second session of the 27th Canadian Parliament on December 21, 1967. Bill C-195 was modified and re-introduced as Bill C-150 by then-Minister of Justice John Turner in the first session of the 28th Canadian Parliament on December 19, 1968. On May 14, 1969, after heated debates, Bill C-150 passed third reading in the House of Commons by a vote of 149 (119 Liberals, 18 New Democrats, 12 Progressive Conservatives) to 55 (43 Progressive Conservatives, 11 Créditistes, 1 Liberal). The bill was a massive 126-page, 120-clause amendment to the criminal law and criminal procedure of Canada.

The bill partially decriminalised homosexual acts and allowed abortion under certain conditions. A related bill, introduced and passed at the same time, decriminalised the sale of contraceptives. The Act also regulated lotteries, tightened the rules for gun possession, and introduced new offences relating to drinking and driving, harassing phone calls, misleading advertising, and cruelty to animals.

John Turner, Trudeau's successor as Minister of Justice, described the bill as "the most important and all-embracing reform of the criminal and penal law ever attempted at one time in this country." Trudeau famously defended the bill by telling reporters that "there's no place for the state in the bedrooms of the nation," adding that "what's done in private between adults doesn't concern the Criminal Code". 

a. John Mercer Reid was elected as a member of the Liberal-Labour Party, but caucused with the Liberal Party of Canada until the 1972 general election, when he rejoined the main political party.

Changes to the Criminal Code

Abortion and contraception

Abortion
Bill C-150 legalized therapeutic abortion under certain conditions. Abortion was previously a criminal offence in Canada, which was still largely influenced by the Catholic Church's moral positions on this issue. Bill C-150 made it legal for women to get an abortion if a therapeutic abortion committee of three doctors felt the pregnancy endangered the mental, emotional or physical well-being of the mother. In a 1999 speech celebrating the 30th anniversary of the bill's passage, Senator Lucie Pépin argued that the new freedom provided by Bill C-150 "proved to be a stepping stone for many other freedoms and options that have altered women's place in [Canadian] society — self-esteem, education, jobs, a voice and empowerment". Abortion legislation in Canada was further liberalized in 1988 with the R. v. Morgentaler ruling, which left Canada without any laws regulating abortion through all nine months of pregnancy.

Contraceptives
Prior to 1968, the Criminal Code made it an offence to offer to sell, advertise, or have in one's possession for the purpose of sale any "medicine, drug, or article intended or represented as a method of preventing conception or causing abortion or miscarriage." As part of the package of reforms contained in the Criminal Law Amendment Act, the government also introduced Bill S-15, which decriminalised contraceptives and brought them under the regulatory power of the Food and Drugs Act, which governs medicines and medicinal devices.  Bill S-15 repealed the reference to contraceptives in the Criminal Code, but left abortifacients criminalised.  Bill S-15 received royal assent on June 27, 1969, the same day as the Criminal Law Amendment Act.

Homosexuality 
Bill C-150 decriminalized "buggery" and "gross indecency" between adults over age 21, and between husband and wife, provided each party consented.  The two offences had been used to criminalise homosexual acts between men. The British Parliament's adoption of the Sexual Offences Act 1967, influenced Trudeau's decision to include amendments to the Criminal Code concerning homosexuality in Bill C-150. Opposition to homosexuality was so intense that the Catholic Créditistes of Quebec held up debate for three weeks. The Créditistes suggested that communism, socialism and atheism were behind the proposed changes relating to homosexuality and abortion; they demanded that a public referendum be held on these issues and staged a filibuster of Parliament over the amendments concerning abortion.

However, even the proponents of the bill argued that "[h]omosexuality in itself is still unlawful", with certain exceptions, while expressing disgust for homosexual practices. Prior to the law being passed, consensual homosexual conduct in private was rarely prosecuted. Historian Tom Hooper says that it is a "myth" that the law decriminalized homosexuality and in fact, it "facilitated the recriminalization of homosexuality in Canada".

Gambling 
Prior to Bill C-150, Criminal Code exemptions that permitted small-scale gambling on behalf of charities were introduced. Between 1892 and 1969, Canadians could wager on horse races or gamble at summer fair midways. These charitable experiences with gambling eventually led Bill C-150 to give the provincial and federal governments the opportunity to use lotteries to fund worthwhile activities (e.g. 1976 Montreal Olympics).

Gun control 
Gun politics in Canada were also affected by Bill C-150, which for the first time made it illegal to provide firearms to persons of "unsound mind" or criminals under prohibition orders. The law also expanded the definition of a 'firearm', which, prior to 1969, included only handguns and automatic firearms, and introduced non-restricted, restricted, and prohibited firearm categories.

Drunk driving
Bill C-150 also addressed the issue of drunk driving. The bill made it an offence to drive with a blood alcohol content (BAC) in excess of 80 mg/100 ml of blood. Refusal of a police officer's demand to provide a breath sample was made an offence at the same time and both began as summary conviction offences, with a mandatory minimum $50 fine.

References

Further reading

Canadian federal legislation
LGBT law in Canada
Canadian abortion law
Gambling legislation
Driving under the influence
1969 in Canadian law
1969 in LGBT history
Canadian criminal law
Canadian firearms law